Shanica Channell Knowles (born November 17, 1990) also known simply as Shanica, is an American actress, singer-songwriter and instrumentalist, known for her roles as Amber Addison on Hannah Montana, Shauna Keaton on Jump In!, and Vanessa on Unfabulous. She has also portrayed the roles of Tichina Arnold on Surviving Compton: Dre, Suge & Michel'le, Simone Burch on The Young and the Restless, and Tahlia on Life-Size 2.

Career
Knowles made her first major acting appearance in 2005 when she played the recurring character Vanessa on season two of the hit Nickelodeon television show Unfabulous. She was later in the Disney Channel Original Movie, Jump In! as Shauna Keaton, alongside Corbin Bleu and Keke Palmer. In 2007, she played a small role in Super Sweet 16: The Movie. Her biggest and most well-known role to date, however, has come from her recurring role as Amber Addison, a snobby popular mean girl and frenemy/rival of main characters Miley Stewart and Lilly Truscott, on the mega-successful Disney Channel television show Hannah Montana, appearing in all four seasons of the show during its run from 2006 to 2011.

In 2015, she starred as Tichina Arnold in the Lifetime biopic Surviving Compton. Knowles appeared as a recurring character, Simone Burch, on the long-running CBS soap opera, The Young and the Restless in 2018, and also co-starred in the Freeform television film Life-Size 2 in December 2018 opposite Tyra Banks and Francia Raisa.

Personal life
Despite numerous reports and sharing the last name, she has stated that she is not the cousin of singers Beyoncé Knowles and Solange Knowles.

Filmography

Film

Television

References

External links
 

1990 births
Actresses from Miami
American soap opera actresses
American television actresses
Living people
21st-century American women